Kheda, also known as Kaira, is a city and a municipality in the Indian state of Gujarat. It was former administrative capital of Kheda district. India's First Deputy Prime Minister Vallabhbhai Patel Was Born In Kheda District of Gujarat State.Kheda city is famous for tobacco farming. Nearest Airport is Ahmedabad airport. Nearest Bus Station is "Kheda Bus Station".

History 
The name Kheda originated from the Sanskrit term Kshetra. Khetaka in used as a name of a region surrounding the place in ancient literature. It is also mentioned as a town from 12th to 17th century. Ganapatha (dated 2nd century BCE), one of the five volumes of Pāṇini' s grammar mentions Khetaka as a name of the region. It is also mentioned as Divyanagar in 133rd chapter of Padmapurana. The 7th and 8th century copper-plates of Maitraka dynasty mentions Khetaka as an administrative division as well as there are mentions of it as a place of Brahmin residence and a Rashtrakuta-controlled town in other copper-plates. There were about 750 villages under that administrative division. It is also mentioned in Nimbavati story of Dashakumaracharita, Acharanga Sutra, Merutunga's Prabandhachintamani (1305 CE), Puratana-prabandha-sangraha (before 15th century, multiple authors) and Jinaprabha's Vividh-tirtha-kalpa (c. 1332 CE).

It was under Chaulukya and Vaghela dynasties from 10th to the start of the 14th century. It was brought under Gujarat Sultanate then. The town of Kheda passed to the Babi Dynasty (of Pashtun descent) early in the eighteenth century, with whom it remained until 1763, when it was taken by the Marathas under Damajirao Gaekwad. Mahmad Khan Babi built its fort. The Marathas under Anandrao Gaekwad ceded the district to the British in 1803, and it became part of the Bombay Presidency of British India. Nevertheless Kaira was still entitled, at least in 1901, to a tribute of 488 Rupees from the Koli petty princely state of Ghorasar. Kheda was a large military station until 1830, when the cantonment was removed to Deesa. Brahmin established many villages in the Kheda District area, as did Jats and other groups.

Kheda is also where Mahatma Gandhi launched, starting March 1919, the Satyagraha struggle against oppressive taxation by the British during a time of famine.

The Babi family which ruled Kheda shifted to Khambat and now most of that family lives in Ahmedabad. The last head of the Kheda family, Sahibzada Ahmed Siddique Hussain khanji Dilawar khanji Babi, was married to Bima Rahim sultana bakhte babi sahiba of Junagarh State, and issued a daughter named Bima Nasreen sultana bakhte Babi, who is married to Sahibzada Anis Muhammad khanji babi of Devgam A house of Junagadh state.

Koli Rebellion Of Kheda 
The Koli Rebellion Of Kheda was raised by koli Patels and koli Thakors against East India Company in 1803. The EIC claimed the kheda and surrounding villages and made his rules for peoples. But kolis refused to obey their rules. Koli chiefs (Thakors and Patels) declared the end of Company rule. First koli chiefs filed petitions in Court of Law in Kheda stating that Company government have no authority over kolis but koli chiefs were ignored. The koli chiefs started raiding and plundering the British territories. In 1808, koli chieftains started raids in cities and villages, stealing the crops, animals and other possessions. The town of Dholka Taluka was main target of kolis. The armed kolis numbering one hundred and fifty attacks at dholka and respectfully returned into their villages. East India Company was unable to control the raids of koli chiefs.

Geography 
It has an average elevation of 21 metres (68 feet). Kheda is on the banks of Vatrak and Shedhi rivers.

Population

Demographics 
 India census, Kheda had a population of 27000. Males constitute 52% of the population and females 48%. Kheda has an average literacy rate of 70%, higher than the national average of 59.5%: male literacy is 77%, and female literacy is 63%. In Kheda, 13% of the population is under 6 years of age.

Castes and Clans 
The clans of Jats in Gujarat are similar to those of Jats of North India. The following clans are found in the Kheda District. The way they are written in Gujarati is given in brackets. Kheda District is one of few districts in Gujarat with a Jat population (Banas Kantha, Mehsana, Sabar Kantha, Kutchh, etc.)

 Chauhan, Chawan, Chahar (Chauhan)
 Gaur, Goru (Gaur, Gor)
 Godara-Godha (Goda)
 Gulia (Galia)
 Maan (Manar)
Jain Religion is Most developed in Kheda.
Rajputs in this District are usually of the Chauhan clan. Rajputs have had a huge influence in this area as in the state of Gujarat in general. There are Vohra/Vora Gujjar populations also.

Many of the villages have names based on the clans of Jats who inhabited them, including :
 Sunda (jat)
 Odasi (jat)
 Narwar (jat)
 Pichkya (jat)

Visiting Places
There is one temple of Meldi Mata in Kheda, which holds an annual fair in February. Around 100,000 people visit Kheda for this event. Mahalaxmi Mata Mandir and Khediya Hanuman, Mankameshwar Mahadev, Somnath temple  and Jain temples are   places of interest. There is one 250 years of Haveli.

Bhidbhanjan Amizara Jain Mota Derasar is an ancient Jain tirtha, which is well visited.

Next to Kheda Vitthalpura Village Siddhnath Mahadev Temple Hindu Temple. 
There Are Many Places to Visiting in Kheda.

Economy
Tobacco farming is widespread.

Transport
The National Highway No. 48 (formally NH 8 )connecting Ahmedabad and Mumbai passes through Kheda. All Types Of state Bus and Local Transporter are available.

References 

Cities and towns in Kheda district